Steph Tolev is a Canadian stand-up comedian born in 1985. She is most noted for her 2019 comedy album I'm Not Well, which received a Juno Award nomination for Comedy Album of the Year at the Juno Awards of 2020.

In addition to her solo standup work, Tolev has also performed in the comedy duo LadyStache with Allison Hogg.

References

21st-century Canadian comedians
Canadian stand-up comedians
Canadian women comedians
Canadian Comedy Award winners
Canadian people of Bulgarian descent
Living people
Year of birth missing (living people)